The 2015 All-Ireland Under 21 Football Championship was an inter county football competition between all 32 counties in Ireland. Four competitions were contested in each of the provinces and the winners of each provincial championship entered the all-Ireland series. The competition was sponsored for the first time by EirGrid.

Tyrone defeated Tipperary in the final on a 1-11 to 0-13 scoreline.

2015 Leinster Under-21 Football Championship

Preliminary round
Laois 4-12 Wexford 1-11 (25 February)	
Louth 3-11 Carlow 2-10  (25 February)	
Longford 4-13 Wicklow 1-05 (25 February)

Quarter-finals
Meath 1-10 Westmeath 1-08 (4 March)	
Longford 1-17 Louth 1-04 (4 March)	
Dublin 2-21 Laois 2-10 (4 March)	
Kildare 3-12 Offaly 0-09 (5 March)

Semi-finals

Final

2015 Munster Under-21 Football Championship

Quarter-finals
Cork 5-18 Limerick 2-12 (11 March)	
Clare 2-11 Waterford 0-3 (11 March)

Semi-finals

Final

2015 Connacht Under-21 Football Championship

Quarter-final
Mayo 4-7 Leitrim 0-8 (11 March)

Semi-finals
Roscommon 6-18 Sligo 0-12 (18 March)	
Mayo 0-11 Galway 1-12 (21 March)

Final

2015 Ulster Under-21 Football Championship

Preliminary round
Derry 2-12 Down 1-11 (11 March)

Quarter-finals
Tyrone 0-17 Fermanagh 0-7 (18 March)	
Donegal 1-7 Cavan 0-9 (18 March)
Monaghan 0-15 Derry 1-8 (18 March)
Armagh 2-13 Antrim 1-5 (22 March)

Semi-finals
Donegal 4-9 Monaghan 1-5 (1 April)	
Tyrone 2-12 Armagh 2-8 (1 April)

Final

All-Ireland

Semi-finals

Final

References

External links
Full Fixtures and Results

All-Ireland Under-21 Football Championships
All-Ireland Under 21 Football Championship